A package format is a type of archive containing computer programs and additional metadata needed by package managers. While the archive file format itself may be unchanged, package formats bear additional metadata, such as a manifest file or certain directory layouts. Packages may contain either source code or executable files.

Packages may be converted from one type to another with software such as Alien.

Common formats

Specialized formats

Generic formats 
Arch Linux's Pacman and Slackware use Tar archives with generic naming but specific internal structures.

References

 
Package management systems